Bossiaea calcicola is a species of flowering plant in the family Fabaceae and is endemic to the far west of Western Australia. It is compact, glaucous, spiny shrub with oblong, wedge-shaped or round leaves and bright yellow, reddish and greenish-yellow flowers.

Description

Taxonomy and naming
Bossiaea calcicola was first formally described in 2006 by James Henderson Ross in the journal Muelleria, from specimens collected near Eagle Gorge in Kalbarri National Park in 1989. The specific epithet (calcicola) means "limestone-dweller", referring to this species' habitat preference.

Distribution and habitat
This bossiaea grows on coastal cliffs and slopes in soil derived from limestone and occurs between Dirk Hartog Island and Geraldton in the Carnarvon, Geraldton Sandplains and Yalgoo biogeographic regions in the far west of Western Australia.

Conservation status
Bossiaea calcicola is classified as "Priority Three" by the Government of Western Australia Department of Parks and Wildlife meaning that it is poorly known and known from only a few locations but is not under imminent threat.

References

calcicola
Eudicots of Western Australia
Plants described in 2006